Lincoln Albion Football Club was an English football club from Lincoln.

History
The club was formed from players of the Lincoln Albion cricket club, which had been active since at least 1850, and whose first reported football match was a draw with Brigg Britannia in 1878.

The club's ethos was amateurism and working class:

The Albion was a regular entrant in the Lincolnshire Senior Cup from 1882, its best run being to the semi-finals in 1883–84, losing to Spilsby by the only goal.

The only entry the club made to the FA Cup was in 1887–88.  The club lost in the first round to Basford Rovers in Nottingham, all of the goals coming in the first half; with ten minutes' remaining the Albion had a goal disallowed for handball.  

Despite the hopes of the Athletic News that "the experience may bring more support and more members to the club", the club appears only to have played twice more; losing in the first round of the local cup to Grimsby Humber Rovers and a low-key friendly against a Wesleyan chapel side.

References

Defunct football clubs in Lincolnshire